Coleophora aphrocrossa is a moth of the family Coleophoridae. It is found in Gulmarg, in western Jammu and Kashmir, India.

The wingspan is about 12 mm. The head is light greyish, although the crown is fuscous except the sides. The palpi are white. The antennae are white ringed dark fuscous and the thorax is grey. The forewings are also grey, although the costal edge is ochreous-white from near the base to the apex. The hindwings are light grey.

References

aphrocrossa
Moths of Asia
Moths described in 1933